Üdü Ẁüdü is the sixth studio album by French rock band Magma, released on 10 September 1976.

The very first issue of this album was issued with a provisional sleeve, as Klaus Blasquiz's artwork was not finished on time. This art features in all later issues.

Track listing 
Source: Discogs, Seventh Records

Legacy
In order, bonus track "Ëmëhntëht-Rê (extrait no. 2)", "Hhaï" (from live album Live/Hhaï), and "Zombies", were incorporated into the Magma composition Ëmëhntëhtt-Ré,  constituting the entirety of "Ëmëhntëhtt-Ré II".

Bassist Jannick Top re-recorded his compositions "Soleil d'Ork" and "De Futura" for his 2001 debut solo album Soleil d'Ork.

Bassist Bernhard Paganotti and keyboardist Patrick Gauthier formed their own zeuhl band, Weidorje, in 1977.

Personnel

Musicians
Magma
 Christian Vander – percussion (1-3), vocals (1-3, 5, 7), keyboards (1, 3, 5), drums (2-7), synthesizer (3, 5), piano (7)
 Jannick "Janik" Top – bass (1, 3-7), horn arrangement (1), fret-cello (3, 5, 6), vocals (4, 6), percussion (4), synthesizer (4), O.R.S. bass synthesizer (6), keyboards (6)
 Klaus Blasquiz – vocals (1, 2, 6, 7), growl (4)
 Stella Vander – vocals (1, 7)
 Michel Graillier – piano (1)
 Patrick Gauthier – piano (2) synthesizer (2, 7)
 Bernard Paganotti – bass (2), percussion (2), vocals (2)
Additional Musicians
 Lisa Deluxe – vocals (1)
 Lucille Cullaz – vocals (1)
 Catherine Szpira – vocals (1)
 Alain Hatot – saxophones (1), flutes (4) 
 Pierre Dutour – trumpets (1)

Technical
 Giorgio Gomelsky – producer
 Jean Peal Malek – engineer, mixer
 Alain Français – engineer
 Gilles Grenier – mixer
 Klaus Blasquiz – cover art (after original issue)

References

1976 albums
Magma (band) albums
Progressive rock albums by French artists